The Sun Rises (Romanian: Răsare soarele) is a 1954 Romanian drama film directed by Dinu Negreanu. It was made at the recently opened Buftea Studios in Bucharest. The film is a sequel to Negreanu's 1953 film The Bugler's Grandsons, and covers the Second World War and post-war years.

Cast
 Marga Barbu 
 Constantin Codrescu 
 Iurie Darie 
 Fory Etterle 
 Constantin Ramadan 
 Marieta Sadova 
 Ion Talianu 
 George Vraca as Dobre Racoviceanu

References

Bibliography 
 Liehm, Mira & Liehm, Antonín J. The Most Important Art: Eastern European Film After 1945. University of California Press, 1977.

External links 
 

1954 films
1954 drama films
Romanian drama films
1950s Romanian-language films
Films directed by Dinu Negreanu
Romanian black-and-white films
Eastern Front of World War II films
Romanian World War II films